

September 2011

See also

References

List of killings by law enforcement officers in the United States, 2011
2011 in American law
United States
 09
September 2011 events in the United States